Animal disenhancement (or diminishment) is the practice of selectively breeding or genetically engineering animals to reduce their capacities. A prominent example is breeding genetically blind chickens, which tend to peck their peers less than sighted chickens. Animal ethicists have argued that farming diminished animals is morally preferable to farming present-day breeds if their lives contain less suffering. However, they have disagreed as to whether diminished animals' lives do contain less suffering.

Animal disenhancement can be seen as a spectrum, at the end of which lie animal microencephalic lumps (also microcephalic, AMLs). AMLs are hypothetical non-sentient animals that humans might some day create. AMLs would have such small brains that they would lack the cognitive capacity to feel pain or have interests.

See also 
 Cellular agriculture, the production of animal tissue from cells rather than living animals.
 Cultured meat, an instance of cellular agriculture.

References 

Disenhancement